This article lists the confirmed squads for the 2009 Women's FIH Hockey Junior World Cup tournament held in Boston, United States between 3 and 16 August 2009.

Pool A

Chile
Head coach: Ronald Stein

Beatriz Wirth (GK)
Sofía Walbaum (C)
Javiera MacKenna
Constanza Sánchez
Camila Caram
María José MacKenna
Manuela Urroz
Paula Leniz
Josefa Villalabeitia
Marianna Pollmann
Andrea Green
Valentina Cerda (GK)
Catalina Sclabos
Constanza Palma
Paula Liu
María Jesús Arestizabal
Tatiana Sclabos 
Francisca Vidaurre

England
Head coach: Craig Parnham

Gemma Ible (GK)
Madeleine Hinch (GK)
Jennifer Hall
Sophie Bray
Kristy Dawson
Sara-Jo Coakley
Samantha Quek (C)
Susannah Townsend
Philippa Newton
Abigail Harper
Loren Sherer
Harriet Pearce
Charlotte Craddock
Lauren Turner
Georgina Twigg
Hollie Webb
Sarah Haycroft 
Amy Turnbull

France
Head coach: Carole Thibaut Tefri

Alix Perrocheau
Perrine Roger
<li value=4>Marie-Julie Munch
<li value=5>Juliette Hevin
<li value=6>Fanny Verrier
<li value=7>Elise Preney ([[Captain (sports)|C]])
<li value=8>Claire Sansonetti
<li value=9>Charlotte Boyer
<li value=11>Léa Langrenay
<li value=12>Margaux da Galzain
<li value=13>Louise Lebaindre
<li value=14>Elodie Broutain
<li value=15>Juliette Parent
<li value=17>Bulle Texier
<li value=19>Athena Richard
<li value=20>Apolline Rogeau
<li value=31>Sylvine da Cunha (GK)
<li value=32>Anne-Sophie Daire (GK)

South Korea
Head coach: Lim Heung-Sin

<li value=1>Cho Eun-Bee (GK)
<li value=2>Park Tae-Yang
<li value=3>Cheon Seul-Ki
<li value=4>Kim Hee-Jung
<li value=5>Kim Da-Young
<li value=6>Kim Ok-Ju
<li value=7>Lee Soo-Kyung
<li value=8>Hong Yoo-Jin
<li value=9>Park Ki-Ju
<li value=10>Kim Ah-Ra
<li value=11>Bae Ho-Syun
<li value=12>Yoo Jung-Mi
<li value=13>Jeon Yu-Mi
<li value=14>Kwon Yong-Kyung
<li value=15>Kim Ye-Jin
<li value=16>Oh Su-Jin (GK)
<li value=17>Lee Nam-Young ([[Captain (sports)|C]])
<li value=18>Shim Ye-Jin

Pool B

Argentina
Head coach: Guillermo Fonseca

<li value=1>Florencia Saravia (GK)
<li value=2>Delfina Merino
<li value=4>Josefina Wholfeiler
<li value=5>Rocío Sánchez Moccia
<li value=7>Ana Bertarini
<li value=8>Martina Cavallero
<li value=9>Carla Dupuy
<li value=10>Sofía Román
<li value=11>Romina Lozzia
<li value=12>Marisol Saenz (GK)
<li value=14>Natalia del Frari
<li value=15>Macarena Rojas
<li value=16>Luciana Soracco
<li value=20>Victoria Zuloaga ([[Captain (sports)|C]])
<li value=21>María José Fernández
<li value=22>Florencia Calvete
<li value=24>Rocío González Canda 
<li value=30>Josefina Sruoga

Germany
Head coach: Marc Herbert

<li value=1>Kim Platten (GK)
<li value=2>Karo Amm (GK)
<li value=3>Jana Teschke
<li value=6>Franzisca Hauke
<li value=7>Lisa Hapke
<li value=8>Pia Grambusch
<li value=9>Lisa Hahn
<li value=10>Nicole Pahl
<li value=11>Hannah Krüger ([[Captain (sports)|C]])
<li value=12>Charlotte van Bodegom
<li value=13>Roda Müller-Wieland
<li value=14>Inga Stöckel
<li value=15>Hannah Pehle
<li value=16>Luisa Steindor
<li value=18>Anke Brockmann
<li value=22>Mia Sehlmann
<li value=24>Eva Frank 
<li value=25>Céline Wilde

Lithuania
Head coach: James Young

<li value=1>Ieva Kuodytė (GK)
<li value=2>Ina Kenstavičiūtė
<li value=3>Ernesta Kalinauskaitė
<li value=4>Monika Vikaitė
<li value=5>Irmante Paulavičiūtė (GK)
<li value=6>Simona Grubliauskaitė ([[Captain (sports)|C]])
<li value=7>Aiste Garbatavičiūtė
<li value=8>Evelina Malyševa
<li value=9>Raminta Žukaitė
<li value=10>Jurate Juodytė
<li value=12>Giedre Kvilonaitė
<li value=13>Ausra Bardauskaitė
<li value=14>Raimonda Nyderytė
<li value=16>Raimonda Nyderytė
<li value=17>Ramune Petrauskaitė 
<li value=18>Evelina Neverdauskaitė

South Africa
Head coach: Fabian Gregory

<li value=1>Hanli Hattingh (GK)
<li value=2>Camille Jasson (GK)
<li value=3>Celia Evans
<li value=4>Philippa Rabey
<li value=5>Loreen Irvine ([[Captain (sports)|C]])
<li value=6>Julia Cass
<li value=7>Kelly Madsen
<li value=8>Mapule Mokoena
<li value=9>Nicole Kemp
<li value=10>Sarah Harley
<li value=11>Jade Mayne
<li value=12>Kerry Pearton
<li value=13>Catherine McNulty
<li value=15>Candice Manuel
<li value=16>Sulette Damons
<li value=17>Nicolene Terblanche
<li value=18>Ncedisa Magwentshu 
<li value=25>Louise Coertzen

Pool C

China
Head coach: Jin Jianmin

<li value=1>Zhang Lei (GK)
<li value=2>Li Shufang
<li value=4>Zhang Ying
<li value=5>Bao Qianqian
<li value=6>Huang Ting
<li value=7>Liao Jiahui
<li value=8>De Jiaojiao
<li value=9>Zheng Qiuling
<li value=10>Zhao Yudiao
<li value=11>Zhang Wenting
<li value=12>Fu Lixin
<li value=14>Sun Yang
<li value=15>Sun Sinan ([[Captain (sports)|C]])
<li value=17>Ye Yanmei
<li value=18>Huang Chenghong (GK)
<li value=19>Wang Zhishuang
<li value=20>Wang Mengyu 
<li value=30>Liu Pan

Netherlands
Head coach: Sjoerd Marijne

<li value=1>Mirte van der Vliet (GK)
<li value=2>Juliette Hentenaar
<li value=3>Floortje Verheul
<li value=4>Kitty van Male
<li value=5>Roos Stam
<li value=6>Michelle van der Pols
<li value=7>Ireen van den Assem
<li value=9>Elsemiek Groen
<li value=10>Kelly Jonker
<li value=11>Margot van Geffen
<li value=12>Caia van Maasakker
<li value=13>Joyce Sombroek (GK)
<li value=14>Fleur van Dooren
<li value=16>Kiki Collot d'Escury ([[Captain (sports)|C]])
<li value=18>Willemijn Bos
<li value=20>Jacky Schoenaker
<li value=21>Emilie Mol 
<li value=22>Willemijn Willemse

New Zealand
Head coach: Chris Leslie

<li value=1>Gemma Flynn
<li value=3>Bridget Blackwood
<li value=5>Carli Michelsen
<li value=6>Cathryn Finlayson
<li value=7>Danielle Jones
<li value=8>Stacey Michelsen
<li value=9>Frances Shaw
<li value=10>Jacinda McLeod
<li value=12>Kate Savory
<li value=13>Katie Glynn
<li value=14>Elizabeth Gunson
<li value=15>Lucy Talbot ([[Captain (sports)|C]])
<li value=17>Taelar Samuel (GK)
<li value=18>Nicola Howes (GK)
<li value=19>Sophie Devine
<li value=20>Fiona Morrison
<li value=21>Petrea Webster 
<li value=22>Natasha FitzSimons

Spain
Head coach: Angel Laso

<li value=1>Mélani García (GK)
<li value=2>Naiara Altuna ([[Captain (sports)|C]])
<li value=3>Anna Lloveras
<li value=4>Carla Martínez
<li value=5>Andrea Puig
<li value=7>Carlota Petchamé
<li value=8>Marta Martín
<li value=9>María López
<li value=10>Berta Bonastre
<li value=11>Empar Gil
<li value=12>Beatriz Pérez
<li value=13>Olatz Goñi
<li value=14>Virginia Egusquiza
<li value=15>Maialen García
<li value=16>María Ruíz (GK)
<li value=17>Paula Pastor
<li value=18>Georgina Oliva 
<li value=20>Lola Riera

Pool D

Australia
Head coach: Katrina Powell

<li value=2>Georgia Nanscawen
<li value=4>Casey Eastham ([[Captain (sports)|C]])
<li value=5>Tamsin Lee
<li value=6>Jill Dwyer
<li value=7>Rachel Miller
<li value=8>Tegan Holcroft
<li value=9>Marnie Hudson
<li value=10>Hannah Cohen
<li value=11>Emily Hurtz
<li value=12>Jade Warrender
<li value=14>Ashlee Wells (GK)
<li value=15>Kate Denning
<li value=16>Heather Langham
<li value=18>Bianca Greenshields ([[Captain (sports)|C]])
<li value=19>Kate Jenner
<li value=24>Harriet Moore (GK)
<li value=26>Danielle Schubach 
<li value=28>Anna Flanagan

Belarus
Head coach: Heorhi Belski

<li value=2>Rehina Sycheuskaya
<li value=3>Khrystsina Kibkova
<li value=4>Alena Fedarovich
<li value=5>Hrazhyna Verameichyk
<li value=6>Sviatlana Bahushevich
<li value=7>Volha Kazak
<li value=8>Volha Nikitsenka
<li value=9>Hanna Vaitkevich
<li value=11>Yuliya Mikhenichik ([[Captain (sports)|C]])
<li value=12>Verinka Mikanovich (GK)
<li value=13>Anastassiya Tomal
<li value=14>Natallia Stsiafutkina
<li value=15>Nastassia Shcharbakova
<li value=16>Krestsina Kulinkovich
<li value=17>Alena Hladkaya
<li value=22>Yauheniya Lestko (GK)

India
Head coach: M.K. Kaushik

<li value=2>Sandeep Kaur
<li value=3>Savita Punia (GK)
<li value=6>Kirandeep Kaur
<li value=7>Rosalind Ralte
<li value=8>Monika Badran
<li value=11>Poonam Rani
<li value=13>Joydeep Kaur Saggu
<li value=14>Preety Sunila Kiro
<li value=15>Ritu Rani
<li value=16>Vandana Kataria
<li value=18>Asem Manorama Devi Asem
<li value=20>Jasdeep Kaur (GK)
<li value=21>Soundarya Yendala
<li value=23>Sulochana Kishan
<li value=24>Roselin Dung Dung
<li value=27>Ranjita Devi Thockchom ([[Captain (sports)|C]])
<li value=28>Rani Devi
<li value=29>Kiran Dahiya

United States
Head coach: Tracey Fuchs

<li value=2>Camille Gandhi
<li value=3>Tara Puffenberger
<li value=4>Alexis Pappas
<li value=5>Brianna Davies
<li value=7>Kelsey Kolojejchick
<li value=9>Michelle Vittese
<li value=10>Paige Selenski
<li value=13>Melissa González
<li value=14>Katherine Reinprecht
<li value=15>Elizabeth Drazdowski
<li value=16>Kathleen O'Donnell ([[Captain (sports)|C]])
[[Marta Malmberg]]
<li value=18>[[Julia Reinprecht]]
<li value=19>[[Rayell Heistand]]
<li value=20>[[Jaclyn Briggs|Jaclyn Kintzer]] ([[Goalkeeper (field hockey)|GK]])
<li value=21>[[Laura Gerbhart]]
<li value=23>[[Katelyn Falgowski]]
<li value=32>[[Alesha Widdall]] ([[Goalkeeper (field hockey)|GK]])
{{div col end}}

References
{{reflist}}

External links
[https://web.archive.org/web/20120311032841/http://www.2009womenjuniorworldcup.sportcentric.com/vsite/vcontent/page/newslist/0,8506,5215-196520-213743-46885-news-list,00.html Official website]

{{Women's FIH Hockey Junior World Cup}}

[[Category:2009 Women's Hockey Junior World Cup|Squads]]
[[Category:Women's Hockey Junior World Cup squads]]